Anant Gangaram Geete (born 2 June 1951) is an Indian politician and was the Union Cabinet Minister for Heavy Industries and Public Sector Enterprises during 2014 - 2019 in Narendra Modi cabinet. He is also a former Union Cabinet Minister for Power (Aug 2002 to May 2004). He is a member of the Shiv Sena (Uddhav Balasaheb Thackeray) political party in Maharashtra, India.

He was elected six times to the Lok Sabha. In the 2009 general election, he defeated the then sitting MP and former Cabinet Minister A.R.Antulay, by a margin of 145,000 votes to win from the Raigad, Maharashtra. In the 2014 general election, he held his seat in Raigad by a margin of 2,110 votes over nearest rival, Sunil Tatkare who was then the Minister for Water Resources in Maharashtra but lost it in 2019 by a margin of 31,740 votes.  He has earlier represented the Ratnagiri constituency in Maharashtra for four terms from 11th Lok Sabha to 14th Lok Sabha.

Early life
He was born in Tisangi, a village in Ratnagiri District, Maharashtra.

Political career

Positions held in Public life

See also
 First Modi ministry

References

External links
 Election Commission of India, General Elections, 2009 (15th LOK SABHA)
 Official biographical sketch in Parliament of India website
 Shiv Sena releases first list of candidates – Sakaal Times

|-

|-

|-

|-

1951 births
Living people
Shiv Sena politicians
India MPs 1996–1997
India MPs 1998–1999
India MPs 1999–2004
India MPs 2004–2009
India MPs 2009–2014
India MPs 2014–2019
Marathi politicians
Lok Sabha members from Maharashtra
Union Ministers from Maharashtra
Narendra Modi ministry
People from Ratnagiri
Ministers of Power of India